Tony Heurtebis (born 15 January 1975) is a French football goalkeeper who played for Stade Rennais, Troyes AC, Stade Brestois and FC Nantes Atlantique. He has been capped for the France under-21 squad.

Statistics

Honours
Troyes AC
UEFA Intertoto Cup: 2001

References

1975 births
Association football goalkeepers
Brittany international footballers
Footballers from Loire-Atlantique
French footballers
ES Troyes AC players
FC Nantes players
Ligue 1 players
Living people
Sportspeople from Saint-Nazaire
Stade Brestois 29 players
Stade Rennais F.C. players